Fishing Lake may refer to any of the following:

Lakes 
Fishing Lake, a lake in Saskatchewan, Canada
Fishing Lakes, a chain of lakes in Saskatchewan, Canada
Upper Fishing Lake, a lake in Saskatchewan, Canada
Lower Fishing Lake, a lake in Saskatchewan, Canada
Little Fishing Lake, a lake in Saskatchewan

Communities 
Fishing Lake Metis Settlement, a settlement in Alberta, Canada
Fishing Lake First Nation, a First Nation in Saskatchewan, Canada
Fishing Lake 89, an Indian reserve in Saskatchewan, Canada
Fishing Lake 89A, an Indian reserve in Saskatchewan, Canada
Fishing Lake 89D1, an Indian reserve in Saskatchewan, Canada
Little Fishing Lake, Saskatchewan, a hamlet in Saskatchewan, Canada
North Shore Fishing Lake, a hamlet in Saskatchewan, Canada